Swimming at the 2004 Summer Paralympics, in the Olympic Aquatic Centre was competed in freestyle, backstroke and butterfly (classes Sn), the breaststroke (classes SBn) and individual medley (classes SMn).

Swimmers with a physical disability were assessed on muscle strength and the scope and coordination of movement, and their impact on different swimming styles. The resultant classes were (lower numbers corresponding to more severe disability):
S1-S10 for freestyle, backstroke, and butterfly 
SB2-SB9 for breaststroke
SM3-SM10 for the individual medley
Swimmers with vision impairment, depending on the degree of vision loss, were classified as S11 (worst vision loss), S12, or S13 (least)

Participating countries

Medal table

Medal summary

Men's events

Women's events

See also
Swimming at the 2004 Summer Olympics

References

 
2004 Summer Paralympics events
2004
2004 in swimming